Sedbusk is a hamlet near Hawes and Hardraw Force within the Yorkshire Dales in North Yorkshire, England. Sedbusk is in the civil parish of High Abbotside along with Hardraw and Simonstone. The name of the hamlet derives from the Old Norse , which means 'the bush by the shieling'.

Sedbusk is situated just off the "high road" in Wensleydale (the road on the opposite side of the valley to the A684). The road that goes through the hamlet is part of an old drovers road that is said to have been the route that Mary Queen of Scots travelled along on her way to Castle Bolton.

The hamlet sits in the shadow of Stags Fell (to the north) which was formerly a centre of quarrying for stone and at one point even had a small colliery, though it is believed to have been only sourcing coal for lime burning. Stone produced at Stag Fell was Yoredale Sandstone and whilst production ceased in the 1930s, the tunnels cut into the hillside are still there and are dangerous to enter.

References

External links

Villages in North Yorkshire
Wensleydale